Agha Khan Moghaddam was a Safavid military leader and official, prominent in the late 16th and early 17th centuries. Of Turkoman origin, he was a member of the Moghaddam branch of the Otuziki/Otuzayeki tribe, who were based in the Karabagh Province. When King(Shah) Abbas I (1588–1629) removed Qobad Khan Mokri, then governor of Marageh and a member of the Kurdish Mokri tribe, from his position in 1609 he appointed Agha Khan Moghaddam as its new governor(hakem). From then on, and decisively from 1610 to 1611, when the Mokri Kurds in Maragheh were massacred on the order of Abbas I, the governorship of the city was invariably held by members of the Moghaddam clan until the end of the Qajar period.

Notes

Sources
 
  
 

16th-century births
17th-century deaths
Iranian Turkmen people
History of East Azerbaijan Province
People from Maragheh
Safavid governors
Safavid generals
16th-century people of Safavid Iran
17th-century people of Safavid Iran